Midnight Delight is an American absurdist anthology film written and directed by Rohit Gupta.  It is composed of nine vignettes of characters at a smoking lounge and their antics with people they have never met before. It stars an ensemble cast and produced by Gupta and Saumin Mehta under the production company Dot and Feather Entertainment. The film is the second feature directed by Gupta, best known for Life! Camera Action... and Another Day Another Life.

Midnight Delight premiered at the Cannabis Film Festival in Garberville, Humboldt County, California, where it won the "Judges Choice film of the festival" award followed by garnering various accolades and acclaim at several international film festivals. The film is considered part of the mumblecore movement. It was released on July 21, 2016, via video on demand (VOD) on various platforms including iTunes, Amazon.com, Google Play, Sony, Hoopla, Vimeo, Microsoft Movies & TV, Xbox. Midnight Delight is noted for its realism, concept and narrative style. On October 31, 2016, the film premiered at The Cannabis College in Amsterdam, Netherlands.

Plot
Vignettes composition as follows:

High how are you 
Features Michael Laguerre, John Crann (topics include hats, moisturizer).

Awakening
Features Dipti Mehta, Rachel Myers (topics include maths, infinity).

Epiphanation
Features Shaheed Woods, Michele Ann Suttile (topics include Why do we talk, What do models eat, If water makes us fat, dolphins).

Alone Together
Features Adit Dileep, Sofia Siva (topics include courting insights)

Still here?
Features Michael Laguerre, John Crann.

Hi...?
Features Bill McCrea, Maggie Alexander (as personal trainers.)

How high are you
Features Michael Laguerre, John Crann.

Introspecting
Features Joshua E.

illusion or Reality
Features Michael Laguerre, Alexandra Hellquist as an aspiring actress.

Cast
 Shaheed Woods
 Alexandra Hellquist
 Dipti Mehta
 Michael Laguerre
 John Crann 
 Maggie Alexander
 Michele Suttile 
 Rachel Myers
 Michael Lester
 Bill E. McCrea
 Adit Dileep
 Sofia Sivan

Production

Filming
Midnight Delight has been shot as an improvisatory movie with minimalist techniques and only few pages of treatment for a script. Instead of a script, the actors received outlines, which covered the plot points and were told what had to happen. The film was shot over a period of two nights with multi-camera setup and rehearsals by all actors prior to the filming. It is considered part of the mumblecore movement.

Marketing
The first official poster and teaser-trailer was released on the film's Facebook page on February 21, 2015. The extended version of the trailer was released on September 16, 2015.

Soundtrack 
The score for Midnight Delight features two original songs.

Release
The film was released on July 21, 2016, through video on demand.

Reception
The film opened at the Cannabis Film Festival in Humboldt county, California where the jury stated "Watching Midnight Delight is like smoking a cinematic joint". At its Washington State premiere at the Hempapalooza Music & Film Festival it was stated, "Midnight Delight is a pure cinematic aphrodisiac that brings a completely new and fresh take on cannabis-based movies and culture”.

Critical response
The film received positive reviews.

Daniel Libby of DopeChef was enthusiastic, rating the film four stars out of four. Libby suggested "Midnight Delight might be called a part stoner comedy, part philosophical dialogue on life. Through a series of vignettes featuring interwoven conversations, the characters have cannabis sessions and real stuff comes out" and that the film has something for everyone: "Viewers are sure to relate to at least one of the various characters or stoner-types. There’s something for everyone in the cannabis community. This movie is sure to delight audiences".

Awards and nominations

Selected Official Selection & Screening
 Blowup Chicago International Art House Film Festival, 'Experimental Einstein award' category, US.
 Cabo Verde Int. Film Festival 2016, 'Best Film' category, Sal, Cape Verde.
 Fantasmagorical (Fandom Fest) Film Festival, 'Fantasy Feature', US.
 Frack Fest Oklahoma City Underground Film Festival, US.
 Golden Door Film Festival, US
 Hempapalooza Music & Film Festival, US.
 Hong Kong Art House Film Festival, 'Underground Film', Hong Kong.
 iChill International Film Festival 2016, Manila, Philippines.
 21st Indie Gathering int. Film Festival, 'Drama-Comedy', US.
 Sydney World Film Festival, 'Experimental Film', Australia.

See also
 Clerks
 Coffee and Cigarettes
 Garry Marshall films
 High School
 Harold & Kumar Go to White Castle
 Kid Cannabis
 Pineapple Express
 Super High Me

References

External links
 
 
 

2016 films
2010s fantasy comedy films
American fantasy comedy films
American avant-garde and experimental films
American independent films
DIY culture
Absurdist fiction
American films about cannabis
Films using motion capture
Drug culture
Underground culture
Films directed by Rohit Gupta
2010s avant-garde and experimental films
Mumblecore films
Stoner films
2016 comedy films
2010s English-language films
2010s American films